The Challenge: Invasion of the Champions (originally promoted and titled as The Challenge: Invasion) is the 29th season of the MTV reality game show, The Challenge. The new individual format was filmed in Krabi, Thailand during October and November 2016, and features alumni from The Real World, Road Rules, The Challenge, and Are You the One? competing.

The season premiered on February 7, 2017, and concluded with the reunion special on May 16, 2017.

Contestants

Champion of

Format
The game started off with 18 Underdogs (players who have yet to win a challenge) who get dropped off a boat and onto a beach, where they were living in "The Shelter." They compete individually in challenges, followed by an elimination round. The male and female winners of the challenge would be safe from elimination, and earn their ticket to "The Oasis" — the season house. The last-place finishers of each gender automatically went straight into elimination for the first challenge.

In the second challenge, the challenge winners will choose a player of the opposite gender to go into the elimination. The remainder of the cast then voted in who goes against them for the first and second challenge. The males voted for the females, and vice versa.

In the third challenge, and the last chance to earn a ticket to the Oasis, the winners will be safe from elimination, and the two remaining players of each gender will automatically compete against each other. In the elimination, each gender will compete. The winners of the elimination round would return to the game, and earn a ticket to The Oasis. The losers of the elimination round go home. Players could not go into The Oasis until every ticket had been earned. Players who earned their ticket to the Oasis will be exempt from elimination and will not compete in challenges until the Champions enter the game.

In Episode 5, eight former champions (four male, four female) will enter the game, which will become a team competition - Underdogs vs. Champions. Each challenge will be designated as either an Underdog or a Champion elimination known as "The Fortress". The winning team will earn money in their team bank account depending on the challenge. The best performing male and female of the team designated for the challenge will then choose one player of each gender to go into the elimination. The remainder of the cast will then vote in the players who will go against the nominated players in The Fortress. The winners return to the game, and the losers are eliminated.

Gameplay

Challenge games
 The Over Under: Players start by grabbing a bucket and filling it with mud. They will have to use the mud to try and get over a huge wall that is made up of bamboo poles. After they get over the first wall, they go to a second wall and dig their way under the wall. After they get under the second wall, they go to a tied idol and try and get the idol out from a tricky rope maze.
 Winners: Dario & Nicole
Shell Shocked: Players are paired up into male and female teams. Each team must row an unstable boat to four checkpoints. At each checkpoint, they retrieve a bag of coconuts. Once all of the bags are collected, they return to the starting line where they shoot the coconuts into a basket. The basket is connected to a pole with a weight behind it. The more coconuts they shoot into the basket, the higher the weight goes. The first team to lift the weight wins.
Winners: Hunter & Ashley M.
Caged and Confused: Players are trapped inside a cage hanging on a rope. They pull a rope that will make them spin down to the ground. Each player then must roll to the finish line while still inside their cage. When they reach the finish line, they pull a rope towards them that is connected to a coconut, with a key attached. They use the key to unlock the cage and get out. The player that gets out of the cage first wins. The two remaining players are automatically nominated for elimination.
Winners: Shane & Amanda
Knockout: A ball is catapulted towards the teams. Each team battles to get the ball into their respective goal. The game is played in two separate heats — one for each gender. The team that scores three points, that can be scored in both heats, wins.
Individual Winners: Ashley M. & Dario 
Winning Team: Underdogs
Roll With The Punches: Played in male/female pairs, and two pairs at a time, each pair spends three minutes in a spinning wheel made out of four beams that is suspended above water. Each contestant must leap from beam to beam as many times as possible without falling into the water. A pair accumulates one point for each rotation, and the team who accumulates the most points wins.
Individual Winners: Bananas & Laurel 
Winning Team: Champions
Curry Up: Contestants from each team must solve a puzzle, by consuming a bowl of curry soup at two different stations while racing three miles to their designated puzzle station. The curry bowls at the first stations are spicy, and are spicier at the second station. Underneath the bowls are place mats that represent puzzle pieces that each team can drop off at their designated puzzle station. Each bowl of soup must be empty before a team can take their place mats and race to their puzzle station. The first team to complete their puzzle wins.
Individual Winners: Hunter & Nicole
Winning Team: Champions
Fallout: A large, slippery platform is suspended above water. Played in separate male/female heats, each contestant attempts to grab one of two ropes, and hang on for as long as possible. When the platform pivots like a seesaw, players end up sliding into and knocking other players into the water, making it difficult to hang onto the ropes. When a player falls into the water, his/her time is stopped, and the team with the longest cumulative time hanging on the ropes wins.
Individual Winners: CT & Camila
Winning Team: Underdogs
Crossover: Played in male/female pairs, each player must traverse a series of inflatable tubes that are attached to a moving speedboat. One player starts at one tube, while his/her partner starts on the opposite end. They encounter each other in the middle, and once each player has reached the opposite side, they have to pull themselves toward the boat and retrieve a flag within a three-minute time limit. A pairs' time is stopped once each player has grabbed their flags. The team that retrieves their flag in the fastest average time wins.
Winning Team: Underdogs
X-It: In the first Underdog Bloodbath game, players are harnessed up to an "X" structure. They will grab the puzzle pieces of their color and throw them to their table. Each piece corresponds to a number represented by a symbol. Once they retrieve all of their bags, they must then unhook themselves and solve an ancient puzzle. Each column and row must have the puzzle pieces add up to 21. Pieces of the same symbol can not be used twice in a row or column. The last male and female to complete this task are eliminated.
Eliminated: Hunter & Jenna
Caved In: Players navigate through a series of cages by going through small doors. However, each cage has an obstacle that the team must work through to get to the right door. If a team chooses the wrong door, it gets them back to the previous cage. The team that gets through all of the cages wins.
Winning Team: Underdogs

Elimination games
 In The Trenches: Similar to "Hall Pass" from Battle of the Exes, players start at opposite end of the trench, they have to transfer ten sandbags from one side to the other side.
 Played By: Kailah vs. Marie and Tony vs. Bruno
 Who's Got Balls?: Players have to jump off a platform while holding on to a total of five balls. The player that holds on to the most balls win. If both opponents hold on to the same amount of balls, the winner is determined by the time it took them to jump off.
 Played By: Jenna vs. Anika and Cory vs. Theo
Thai Rise: Players race up to the top of the Tiger Cave Temple, and retrieve a bag of rice that has a bell in it. Once they get the bag, they race back down and hang their bell. The player to do this task the fastest wins.
Played By: Sylvia vs. LaToya and Nelson vs. Anthony
Tuk Tuk Bang Bang: Players stand on the back of a tuk tuk, and have to push their tuk tuk further and further until they reach the end of the driveway, knocking over the wall in the end. The first player to do so wins.
Played By: Sylvia vs. Kailah and Shane vs. Tony
 Pole Wrestle: Similar to the original "Pole Wrestle" from The Duel, players are placed at the center of a circle and place both hands on a wooden pole. The first contestant to wrestle the pole out of the opponent's hands twice, wins.
Played By: Cara Maria vs. Ashley K. and Darrell vs. Zach
Bell Ringer: Players have to break Thai idols using a rope connected to a bell suspended 15 feet above them. As the idols are being smashed, they release powder, making it more difficult for the players to see. The first player to smash all 16 idols wins.
Played By: Nelson vs. Dario and Jenna vs. Sylvia
Balls In: Similar to the original "Balls In" from The Inferno II, Spring Break Challenge and Free Agents, each player is given five chances to get as many balls inside a barrel, located in the middle of a large circle. If a player is either knocked out of or steps out of the ring, or if the ball is knocked out of the ring, their ball is considered "dead". Players alternates between offense and defense in each round. The player who gets to three points wins, with each ball being worth a point. 
Played by: Darrell vs. Bananas and Laurel vs. Cara Maria
Inside Out: In the first round between the three initial players, the players are harnessed to a rope tied behind their back to a ring in a game similar to "Reverse Tug-O-War" and "Looper" from The Gauntlet 2 and Free Agents, respectively. The first player to ring their bell wins that round while the two remaining losing players face off in the final round. In the final round, the losing players are tied together, facing each other this time, the player to get both feet out of the ring in two rounds wins.
Played by: Ashley M. vs. Nicole vs. Amanda, Cory vs. Nelson vs. Shane
Knot So Fast: Similar to the original "Knot So Fast" from Battle of the Seasons (2012) and "It Takes Two to Tangle from Battle of the Exes II, players have 20 minutes to create as many knots using 200 feet of rope within a dome-shaped structure. After those 20 minutes are up, players must untie their opponents' knots. The player who unties the opposing players' knots first wins the elimination.
 Played by: Camila vs. Laurel and CT vs. Darrell

Final challenge
For the final challenge both teams are dismantled and players compete as individuals. Players pair up with each of the opposite gender competitors during the different stages of the final and their final placement is determined by their total final time. In addition to their share of what is in their team bank account, first place players receive $100,000 each, second receive $15,000 each, and third receive $5,000 each. Players must stay at The Shelter for the duration of the final challenge.

 Stage 1: Pairs must swim from a sand barge to an island and solve a triangle puzzle in order to retrieve a key. They must then use a paddleboard to swim back to the barge to unlock another puzzle. Once the puzzle on the barge has been solved, the pair's times will be stopped.
 Time Buster #1: Pairs will try to extract as much water as they can out of a pile of coconuts and deposit it into their team container. The pair with the most water extracted from their coconuts after an hour has the power to assign a five-minute time penalty to two other players.
 Stage 2: Players are divided into new pairs and race over a mile into the jungle to complete a series of checkpoints. Once they are done, players race back in order to stop their times. Tasks include solving a puzzle, eating disgusting dishes, and walking along a rope.
 Time Buster #2: Pairs must lace Thai prayer beads onto a wire spool for an unrevealed amount of time. Whichever pair has the longest strand laced by the time T.J. Lavin returns is able to add a five-minute penalty to two other players.
 Stage 3: Players are divided into new pairs and follow a series of checkpoints leading to a 10-mile kayak ride. Once a pair has rowed their kayak to the barge, their time is stopped.
 Stage 4: Players compete individually and hang on to a bar suspended from a speedboat until they reach a buoy. Upon reaching the buoy players must swim as fast as they can to the finish line where their individual times are stopped. Players that fall off the bar before reaching the buoy must swim the remaining distance. On the shore T.J. announces the final results.
 The Challenge: Invasion of the Champions winners: CT & Ashley
 Second place: Nelson & Camila 
 Third place: Cory & Nicole

Game summary

Elimination chart

Episode progress

Competition
 The contestant won the final challenge
 The contestant did not win the final challenge
 The contestant won the challenge and won safety from the elimination round
 The contestant won the challenge, but was subject to the elimination round
 The contestant was exempt from participating in the elimination round
 The contestant was not selected for the elimination round
 The contestant won in the elimination round
 The contestant lost in the elimination round and was eliminated
 The contestant came in last in the daily challenge and was eliminated
 The contestant withdrew from the elimination round

Bank accounts
Updated after Episode 12

Voting progress

Teams

Episodes

Reunion special
The reunion special aired on May 16, 2017, one week after the season finale, and was hosted by WWE pro wrestler, The Real World: Back to New York alum, and former Challenge champion Mike "The Miz" Mizanin. Cast members who attended were: Amanda, Ashley M., Camila, Cara Maria, Cory, Jenna, Johnny Bananas, Kailah, Shane, CT, Nicole, Laurel, Nelson, Hunter, and Darrell. It had 0.50 million viewers in its first-run airing.

Notes

References

External links
 

Invasion of the Champions, The Challenge
Television shows set in Thailand
2017 American television seasons
Television shows filmed in Thailand